Senate elections were held in the Czech Republic on 25 and 26 October 2002, with a second round on 1 and 2 November. Voter turnout was just 24.1% in the first round and 31.7% in the second.

The results saw the Civic Democratic Party emerge as the most successful party, winning nine seats. Independent candidates were also successful, winning eight seats. The parties of the former Four-Coalition were heavily defeated.

Electoral system
One third of the 81-member Senate is elected every two years, giving Senators six year terms. The seats are elected in single-member constituencies using the two-round system.

Background
Czech Social Democratic Party held 11 Seats in the elected part of Senate. Christian and Democratic Union – Czechoslovak People's Party held second highest number of seats - 6. Both parties were part of governing coalition. Opposition Civic Democratic Party held only 5 Seats. Election was considered important due to 2003 Presidential election. Czech Social Democratic Party was considered front-runner of the election while the Civic Democratic Party was expected to be second strongest party.

Composition of contested seats prior to the elections

Opinion polls

Results

References

Czech Senate election
Czech Senate election
2002
Czech Senate election